Ralph de Gacé († 1051) (a.k.a. Raoul de Gacé) Seigneur de Gacé and other estates in Normandy, was a member of the House of Normandy who played a significant role during the minority of William the Conqueror.

Life
Ralph was the middle son of Robert, Archbishop of Rouen and his wife Herlevea, and, as such, a member of the royal house of Normandy. While his older brother Richard received the countship of Évreux, Ralph was given the seigneury of Gacé in Lower Normandy. He also held Bavent, Noyon-sur-Andelle (now Charleval), Gravençon (near Lillebonne) and Écouché. After the death of Robert I, Duke of Normandy in Nicaea, Archbishop Robert assumed the regency of Normandy for the duke's young illegitimate son William. The archbishop was able to keep order in Normandy but at his death in 1037, rebellions and private wars erupted. 

One of the rebellious lords was Ralph de Gacé. In 1040, assassins acting under the orders of Ralph de Gacé murdered the chief tutor of young duke William, Gilbert, Count of Brionne, while he was riding near Eschafour. In 1043, Duke William and his advisors William, Count of Talou and Archbishop Mauger decided to convince Ralph de Gacé to support the duke. Ralph, now in command of the duke's army next campaigned against Thurstan le Goz who, along with the king of France, had occupied Falaise. Ralph captured Falaise, forced Thurstan into exile, and King Henry I of France to withdraw from Normandy. While Ralph remained a key member of Duke William's inner circle, Ralph was known to have made large donations to the abbey of Jumièges. Ralph died in 1051.

Family
Ralph married Basilla, daughter of Gerard Flaitel. They had a son, Robert de Gacé, who died without heirs. After Ralph's death, Basilla married, secondly, to Hugh de Gournay.

Notes

References

1051 deaths
Year of birth unknown
Ralph
Norman warriors